Sediminibacillus albus is a Gram-positive, moderately halophilic, strictly aerobic, endospore-forming and rod-shaped bacterium from the genus of Sediminibacillus which has been isolated from sediments from the Lake Nanhuobuxun in China.

References

 

Bacillaceae
Bacteria described in 2009